Jingtai (14 January 1450 – 14 February 1457) was the era name of the Jingtai Emperor, the seventh emperor of the Ming dynasty of China, and was used for a total of 7 years.

On 11 February 1457 (Jingtai 8, 17th day of the 1st month), taking advantage of the opportunity that the Jingtai Emperor was seriously ill and could not come to court, Emperor Yingzong launched the "Duomen Coup" (奪門之變, "Storming of the Gates Incident") and restored his imperial throne. On 15 February of the same year (21st day of the 1st month), Emperor Yingzong changed the era to Tianshun.

Comparison table

Other regime era names that existed during the same period
 China
 Dongyang (東陽, 1449–1450): Ming period — era name of Huang Xiaoyang (黃蕭養)
 Xuanyuan (玄元, 1451): Ming period — era name of Zhu Huizha (朱徽煠)
 Tianyuan (添元, 1453–1457): Oirats — era name of Esen
 Tianshun (天順, 1456): Ming period — era name of Li Zhen (李珍)
 Vietnam
 Đại Hòa (大和) or Thái Hòa (太和) (1443–1453): Later Lê dynasty — era name of Lê Nhân Tông
 Diên Ninh (延寧, 1454–1459): Later Lê dynasty — era name of Lê Nhân Tông
 Japan
 Hōtoku (宝徳, 1449–1452): era name of Emperor Go-Hanazono
 Kyōtoku (享徳, 1452–1455): era name of Emperor Go-Hanazono
 Kōshō (康正, 1455–1457): era name of Emperor Go-Hanazono

See also
 List of Chinese era names
 List of Ming dynasty era names

References

Further reading

Ming dynasty eras